Rabbi James Kennard (born 24 June 1964) is an educationalist in the Australian Jewish community.  He was previously the Jewish Student Chaplain at the University of Leeds, headteacher of King Solomon High School in Barkingside, London, and since 2007, is principal of Mount Scopus Memorial College.

Early life and education 
Kennard was born 24 June 1964. He was educated at St Paul's School in London and read mathematics at New College, Oxford.  While at Oxford in 1984, he took part in British televised quiz-show University Challenge. He received rabbinic ordination in Israel in 1989.

Career 
From 1990 to 1992 he was the Jewish student chaplain at the University of Leeds.

From 1994 until 2004  he was the founding head of Jewish Studies, and subsequently head of Yavneh, a division of the King David High School in Manchester, England.  Between 1998 and 2004, he was headteacher of Broughton Jewish Cassel Fox Primary School in Manchester.

From September 2004 to December 2006, James Kennard served as the Headteacher of King Solomon High School, Barkingside, London. In January 2007 he took up the position as principal of Mount Scopus Memorial College in Melbourne, Australia.
He has contributed articles to The Age, Jewish News, Australian Jewish News, and the London Jewish Chronicle, and has appeared on BBC radio and TV.

When in Australia he was a member of the Rabbinical Council of Victoria for a period of time, serving on the executive, although he resigned this position because of his view of rabbinic failure.

Public efforts  
Kennard is a frequent critic of the rabbinic institutions in Australia. He called for the resignations of the heads of the Yeshiva Centre and the rabbis connected to abuse in the religious community.

When the members of the Sydney Beth Din, including Moshe Gutnick and Yehoram Ulman, were found guilty of contempt of court Kennard was the only high profile rabbinic figure to speak against them. He said "I cannot remain silent when the rabbinate of Australia is prevented from fulfilling its primary task – to provide religious leadership to our community – by the refusal of its representatives to act with the highest standards of integrity, which should be the natural hallmark of any who bear the title ‘rabbi’."

References

External links
 RabbiKennard.com
 Mount Scopus Memorial College

1964 births
British Orthodox rabbis
Australian Orthodox rabbis
Alumni of New College, Oxford
Living people
Contestants on University Challenge
Australian Jews
Orthodox rabbis